Venezuela has the world's largest proven oil reserves at an estimated 304 billion barrels (18% of global reserves) as of 2020. The country was one of the world's largest exporters of oil, but the oil industry saw a significant decline since its peak in 2012.

Venezuela is a founding member of the Organization of the Petroleum Exporting Countries (OPEC).

Pre-discovery

Indigenous usage
The Indigenous peoples in Venezuela, like many ancient societies already utilized crude oils and asphalts from petroleum seeps, which ooze through the ground to the surface, in the years before the Spanish conquistadors.  The thick black liquid, known to the locals as mene, was primarily used for medical purposes, as an illumination source, and for the caulking of canoes.

Spanish acquisition
Upon arrival in the early 16th century, the Spanish conquerors learned from the indigenous people to use the naturally occurring bitumen for caulking their ships as well, and for treating their weapons.  The first documented shipment of petroleum from Venezuela was in 1539 when a single barrel of oil was sent to Spain to alleviate the gout of Emperor Charles V.

1908–1940

Despite the knowledge of the existence of oil reserves in Venezuela for centuries, the first oil wells of significance were not drilled until the early 1910s. In 1908, Juan Vicente Gómez replaced his ailing predecessor, Cipriano Castro, as the president of Venezuela.  Over the next few years, Gómez granted several concessions to explore, produce, and refine oil.  Most of these oil concessions were granted to his closest friends, and they in turn passed them on to foreign oil companies that could actually develop them. One such concession was granted to Rafael Max Valladares who hired Caribbean Petroleum Company (later acquired by Royal Dutch Shell) to carry out his oil exploration project. On 15 April 1914, upon the completion of the Zumaque-I (now called MG-I) oil well, the first Venezuelan oilfield of importance, Mene Grande, was discovered by Caribbean Petroleum in the Maracaibo Basin. This major discovery encouraged a massive wave of foreign oil companies to Venezuela in an attempt to gain a foothold in the burgeoning market.

From 1914 to 1917, several more oil fields were discovered across the country including the emblematic Bolivar Coastal Field; however World War I slowed significant development of the industry. Due to the difficulty in purchasing and transporting the necessary tools and machinery, some oil companies were forced to forego drilling until after the war. By the end of 1917, the first refining operations began at the San Lorenzo refinery to process the Mene Grande field production, and the first significant exports of Venezuelan oil by Caribbean Petroleum left from the San Lorenzo terminal. By the end of 1918, petroleum appeared for the first time on the Venezuelan export statistics at 21,194 metric tons.

It was the blowout of the Barroso No. 2 well in Cabimas in 1922 that marked the beginning of Venezuela's modern history as a major producer. This discovery captured the attention of the nation and the world. Soon dozens of foreign companies acquired vast tracts of territory in the hope of striking it rich, and by 1928 Venezuela became the world's leading oil exporter. Oil ended Venezuela's relative anonymity in the eyes of world powers, making it a linchpin of an ever-expanding international oil industry and a new consideration in global policymaking.

Cabimas still plays an important role in production from the nation's largest oil fields, which are located around and beneath Lake Maracaibo. Other fields are increasing in importance, mainly in eastern Venezuela, where the Oficina Formation was discovered in 1937. About twenty years after the completion of the first oil-producing well Venezuela had become the largest oil exporter in the world and, after the United States, the second largest oil producer. Exports of oil boomed between 1920 and 1935. By the end of the 1930s, Venezuela had become the third-leading oil producer in the world, behind the United States and the Soviet Union, as well as the leading exporter.

First Dutch Disease
By 1929, the dramatic development of the Venezuela oil industry had begun to dominate all other economic sectors in the country, however, agricultural production began to decrease dramatically. This sudden increase of attention to oil and neglect of the agrarian sector caused the Venezuelan economy to suffer from a phenomenon which later became known as the Dutch Disease. This "disease" occurs when a commodity brings a substantial increase of income in one sector of the economy, causing a strengthening of currency which in turn harms exports of manufacturing and other sectors.

Agriculture accounted for about one-third of economic production in the 1920s, but by the 1950s this fraction dramatically reduced to one-tenth. This sudden increase of oil production restricted Venezuela's overall ability to create and maintain other industries. The government had ignored serious social problems, including education, health, infrastructure, agriculture, and domestic industries, causing Venezuela to fall well behind other industrialized countries.

1940–1976

By 1940 Venezuela was the third largest producer of crude oil in the world with more than 27 million tonnes per year - just slightly less than the production in the USSR. In 1941, Isaías Medina Angarita, a former army general from the Venezuelan Andes, was indirectly elected president. One of his most important reforms during his tenure was the enactment of the new Hydrocarbons Law of 1943.  This new law was the first major political step taken toward gaining more government control over its oil industry. Under the new law, the government took 50% of profits. Once passed, this piece of legislation basically remained unchanged until 1976, the year of nationalization, with only two partial revisions being made in 1955 and 1967.

In 1944, the Venezuelan government granted several new concessions encouraging the discovery of even more oil fields.

Being an avid supplier of petroleum to the Allies of World War II, Venezuela had increased its production by 42 percent from 1943 to 1944 alone. Even after the war, oil demand continued to rise due to the fact that there was an increase from twenty-six million to forty million cars in service in the United States from 1945 to 1950.

By the mid-1950s, however, Middle Eastern countries had started contributing significant amounts of oil to the international petroleum market, and the United States had implemented oil import quotas. The world experienced an over-supply of oil, and prices plummeted.

Creation of OPEC

In response to the chronically low oil prices of the mid and late 1950s, oil producing countries Venezuela, Iran, Saudi Arabia, Iraq, and Kuwait met in Baghdad in September 1960 to form the Organization of the Petroleum Exporting Countries (OPEC).  The main goal of the OPEC member countries was to work together in order to secure and stabilize international oil prices to ensure their interests as oil producing nations. This was managed largely via maintaining export quotas that helped prevent the overproduction of oil on an international scale.

Oil embargo of 1973

In the early 1970s, oil producing countries of the Persian Gulf began negotiations with oil companies in attempt to increase their ownership participation.  In 1972 they rapidly obtained a 25 percent participation, and less than a year later they revised those agreements to obtain up to 60 percent participation in the ownership of the companies. By 1973, OPEC Persian Gulf states members decided to raise their prices by 70 percent and to place an embargo on countries friendly to Israel (the United States and the Netherlands).  This event became known as the 1973 oil crisis. Following a culmination of conflicts in the Middle East and the oil producing countries of the Persian Gulf no longer exporting to the United States and oil prices rising steeply, Venezuela experienced a significant increase in oil production profits.  Between 1972 and 1974, the Venezuelan government revenues had quadrupled. With a new sense of confidence, Venezuelan president Carlos Andrés Pérez pledged that Venezuela would develop significantly within a few years. By substituting imports, subsidies, and protective tariffs, he planned to use oil profits to increase employment, fight poverty, increase income, and diversify the economy.  However, OPEC members had been violating production quotas, and oil prices fell drastically again in the 1980s, pushing Venezuela deeper into debt.

Nationalization

Well before 1976, Venezuela had taken several steps in the direction of nationalization of its oil industry. In August 1971, under the presidency of Rafael Caldera, a law was passed that nationalized the country's natural gas industry. Also in 1971 the law of reversion was passed which stated that all the assets, plant, and equipment belonging to concessionaires within or outside the concession areas would revert to the nation without compensation upon the expiration of the concession. The movement towards nationalism was experienced once again under decree 832. Decree 832 stipulated that all exploration, production, refining, and sales programs of the oil companies had to be approved in advance by the Ministry of Mines and Hydrocarbons.  Led by finance minister Luis Enrique Oberto, nationalization led to the Venezuelan economy reaching an average growth of 5% between 1970 and 1973.

Nationalization became official when the presidency of Carlos Andrés Pérez, whose economic plan, "La Gran Venezuela", called for the nationalization of the oil industry and diversification of the economy via import substitution.  The country officially nationalized its oil industry on 1 January 1976 at the site of Zumaque oilwell 1 (Mene Grande), and along with it came the birth of Petróleos de Venezuela S.A. (PDVSA) which is the Venezuelan state-owned petroleum company. All foreign oil companies that once did business in Venezuela were replaced by Venezuelan companies. Each of the former concessionaires was simply substituted by a new 'national' oil company, which maintained the structures and functions of its multi-national corporation (MNC)-predecessor.

All the new companies are owned by a holding company-Petroven or PDV- and which in turn is owned by the State. Ultimately not much had changed in this regard, as all Venezuelans with leading positions in the MNCs took over the leading positions of the respective new companies, and therefore still securing their interests in Venezuela's oil. PDVSA controls activity involving oil and natural gas in Venezuela. In 1980s, in an aggressive internationalization plan, PDVSA bought refineries in USA and Europe as the American Citgo that catapulted it to the third-largest oil company in the world.

1977–1998
After the 1973 oil crisis, the period of economic prosperity for Venezuela was relatively short-lived.  As Venezuelan oil minister and OPEC co-founder Juan Pablo Pérez Alfonzo had presciently warned in 1976: "Ten years from now, twenty years from now, you will see, oil will bring us ruin... It is the devil's excrement." This was the case during the "1980s oil glut". OPEC member countries were not adhering strictly to their assigned quotas, and once again oil prices plummeted.

Second Dutch Disease
During the mid-1980s, Venezuela's oil production steadily began to rise. By the 1990s, symptoms of the Dutch Disease were once again becoming apparent. Between 1990 and 1999, Venezuela's industrial production declined from 50 percent to 24 percent of the country's gross domestic product compared to a decrease of 36 percent to 29 percent for the rest of Latin America, but production levels continued to rise until 1998.

However, the efficiency of PDVSA was brought into question over the years. During 1976–1992, the amount of PDVSA's income that went towards the company's costs was on average 29 percent leaving a remainder of 71 percent for the government. From 1993 to 2000, however, that distribution almost completely reversed, to where 64 percent of PDVSA's income were kept by PDVSA, leaving a remainder of only 36 percent for the government. This change in government revenue was due to a change in accounting methods, lower taxation on private investment, higher production of oil sands, and transfer pricing.

1999–present

After Hugo Chávez officially took office in February 1999, several policy changes involving the country's oil industry were made to explicitly tie it to the state under his Bolivarian Revolution. Since then, PDVSA has not demonstrated any capability to bring new oil fields onstream since nationalizing heavy oil projects in the Orinoco Petroleum Belt formerly operated by international oil companies ExxonMobil, ConocoPhillips, Chevron.

The Chávez government used PDVSA resources to fund social programmes, treating it like a "piggybank",  and PDVSA staff were required to support Chávez. His social policies resulted in overspending  that caused shortages in Venezuela and allowed the inflation rate to grow to one of the highest rates in the world .

According to Corrales and Penfold , "Chávez was not the first president in Venezuelan history to be mesmerized by the promise of oil, but he was the one who allowed the sector to decline the most", with most statistics showing deterioration of the industry since the beginning of his presidency.

Chávez's successor, Nicolás Maduro, continued much of the policies championed by Chávez, with Venezuela further deteriorating as a result of continuing such policies.

Reinforcement of OPEC
At the time of Chávez's election, OPEC had lost much of its influence compared to when it was first created.  A combination of OPEC members, including Venezuela, regularly ignoring quotas and non-OPEC countries such as Mexico and Russia beginning to expand on their own petroleum industries resulted in record low oil prices which hurt the Venezuelan economy.  One of Chávez's main goals as president was to combat this problem by re-strengthening OPEC and getting countries to once again abide by their quotas.  Chávez personally visited many of the leaders of oil producing nations around the world, and in 2000, he hosted the first summit of the heads-of-state of OPEC in 25 years (the second ever). Goals of this meeting, held in Caracas, included recuperating the credibility of Venezuela in OPEC, defending oil prices, cementing relations between Venezuela and the Arab/Islamic world, and to strengthen OPEC in general.

The meeting could be considered a success given the record high oil prices of the following years, but much of that is also a consequence of the 11 September 2001 attacks against the United States, the Iraq War, and the significant increase in demand for oil from developing economies like China and India, which helped prompt a surge in oil prices to levels far higher than those targeted by OPEC during the preceding period.  In addition to these events, the December 2002 oil strike in Venezuela, which resulted in a loss of almost 3mmbpd of crude oil production, brought a sharp increase in world prices of crude.

Enabling act laws and controversy

In 2000, the pro-Chávez National Assembly granted Chávez the ability to rule by decree due to the poor economic conditions. On 13 November 2001 while ruling by decree, Chávez enacted the new Hydrocarbons Law, which came into effect in January 2002. The laws "marked a turning point in public sentiment toward the president" with both chavistas and anti-chavistas outraged at the changes. For the opposition to Chávez, such dramatic changes to the government proved to them that Chávez was a "dictator-in-training".

Chávez began setting goals of reinstating quotas, such as ten percent of PDVSA's annual investment budget was to be spent on social programs. He also changed tax policies and the oil revenue collection process. Chavez initiated many of these major changes to exert more control over PDVSA and efficiently deal with the problems he and his supporters had over PDVSA's small revenue contributions to the government. By 2002, warnings grew of the Chávez overspending on social programs in order to maintain populist support.

In December 2002, PDVSA officially went on strike creating a near-complete halt on oil production in Venezuela. The aim of the Venezuelan general strike of 2002-2003 was to pressure Chávez into resigning and calling early elections. The strike lasted approximately two and a half months, and the government ended up firing 12,000 PDVSA employees and replacing them with workers loyal to the Chávez government, many of whom came out of retirement to replace the fired.
By January 2002, protests involving hundreds of thousands of Venezuelans opposing Chávez became common in Venezuela. In April 2002, mass demonstrations occurred in Caracas and Chávez was temporarily overthrown by the military, backed by U.S. interests, during the 2002 Venezuelan coup d'état attempt.

A few months after the failure of the coup and the return of Chavez, a combination of labor unions and business groups called for an "indefinite national strike" which, in many places, turned out to be a forced "bosses lock out" where the employees were prevented from working. When the strike ended, substantial macroeconomic damage had been done with unemployment up by 5 percent. This increase brought the country to a national unemployment peak of over 20 percent in March 2003.

Following the strikes, Chávez referred to regaining control of the industry as "re-nationalization". He aimed at improving the efficiency of PDVSA in the context of distributing a greater amount of its revenues to his government and also by certain changes in taxation. Certain tax reforms had already been implemented earlier in Chávez's first term. By 2006, the government had a 40 percent share, which was announced to be increased by 20 percent.

International deals
In 2005, PDVSA opened its first office in China, and announced plans to nearly triple its fleet of oil tankers in that region.  Chávez had long stated that he would like to sell more Venezuelan oil to China so his country can become more independent of the United States. 
In 2007, Chávez struck a deal with Brazilian oil company Petrobras to build an oil refinery in northeastern Brazil where crude oil will be sent from both Brazil and Argentina. A similar deal was struck with Ecuador where Venezuela agreed to refine  of crude oil from Ecuador at discount prices. Cuba agreed to let thousands of Venezuelans be received for medical treatment and health programs, and in turn, Venezuela agreed to sell several thousands of barrels to Cuba at a 40% discount under Petrocaribe program.

Third Dutch Disease
The Chávez administration used high oil prices in the 2000s on his populist policies and to gain support from voters. The social works initiated by Chávez's government relied on oil products, the keystone of the Venezuelan economy, with Chávez's administration suffering from Dutch disease as a result.

According to Cannon, the state income from oil revenue grew "from 51% of total income in 2000 to 56% 2006"; oil exports increased "from 77% in 1997 [...] to 89% in 2006"; and his administration's dependence on petroleum sales was "one of the chief problems facing the Chávez government". By 2008, exports of everything but oil "collapsed" and in 2012, the World Bank explained that Venezuela's economy is "extremely vulnerable" to changes in oil prices since in 2012 "96% of the country's exports and nearly half of its fiscal revenue" relied on oil production.

Economists say that the Venezuelan government's overspending on social programs and strict business policies contributed to imbalances in the country's economy, contributing to rising inflation, poverty, low healthcare spending and shortages in Venezuela going into the final years of his presidency.

Since 2014, oil production in Venezuela has suffered from a poor oil market and Venezuela's insufficient funding of the industry. Venezuela's nationalistic oil policies have not succeeded in making them more independent from their oil customers. In 2016, the United States imported 291,461,000 barrels of oils from Venezuela, an amount consistent with imports in the five years prior. To assuage the oil price decline which began back in June 2014 and continues through to today, President Maduro printed more currency, resulting in inflation as high as 700% of what the inflation rate was in 2014. The Economic policy of the Nicolás Maduro administration did not revive the oil decline, and by 2016, the oil production reached the lowest it had been in 23 years. According to analysts, the economic crisis suffered under President Nicolás Maduro would have still occurred with or without Chávez.

By 2017, PDVSA could not even afford to export oil through international water, which requires safety inspections and cleaning under maritime law, with a fleet of tankers stranded in the Caribbean Sea due to the issue. In July 2017, this arrangement was extended from just the first half of 2017 to continue until March 2018. This continued depression in income from oil has led Maduro to pressure the OPEC to raise the falling oil prices to help the Venezuelan economy. In April 2017, a controversial Venezuelan Supreme Court ruling granted Maduro executive powers over PDVSA, which allow him act autonomously in selling shares or make international agreements of the oil company. In October 2017, Venezuela had its lowest oil output in 28 years, with only 1.863 million bpd being pumped that month. By late-2017, the PDVSA struggled to repay $725 million of debt, part of a total $5 billion owed.

Recovery efforts
Beginning in 2020 Iran began assisting Venezuela with maintenance and repair of refining facilities.  Iranian state firms were negotiating to repair Venezuela's largest refinery complex, the Paraguaná Refinery Complex which has a capacity of 955,000 barrels per day.

Gallery

See also

 Corporación Trebol Gas C.A.

Citations

General references 

Geology of Venezuela
Ven
History of Venezuela
Petroleum in Venezuela